António José Marreco de Gouveia (born 25 July 1987), known as Tozé Marreco, is a Portuguese former professional footballer who played as a striker, currently manager of C.D. Tondela.

In a journeyman career that included nine Primeira Liga games for Beira-Mar and Olhanense, he played 197 games and scored 62 goals in the second tier for seven clubs and was Player of the Season as Tondela won the title in 2015. He also had brief spells in five foreign countries.

Playing career

Youth
Born in Miranda do Corvo, Coimbra District, Marreco began his youth career at local CD Lousanense, subsequently moving to another club in the region, C.F. União de Coimbra.

At União, he played in several attacking positions including in midfield, but was ultimately dispensed with at the end of the 2001–02 season, going on to finish his development with regional giants Académica de Coimbra, where he was a prolific goal scorer.

Professionals
In January 2007, after starting professionally with F.C. Pampilhosa, Marreco signed for CA Mirandense also in the third division. On 12 August, a phone call from his agent Jorge Baidek offered an invitation from Dutch Eerste Divisie side FC Zwolle, and he agreed to a contract later in the month. He had a very successful season, being the second-best Portuguese scorer abroad only trailing Cristiano Ronaldo while also helping his team to the promotion playoffs (finally without success) and the quarter-finals of the KNVB Cup, where they lost to eventuals winner Feyenoord.

Marreco joined Deportivo Alavés in the Spanish Segunda División in the summer of 2008, but did not play any competitive matches with the Basques. On 22 January 2009 he moved to Bulgaria's FC Lokomotiv Mezdra on a three-year deal, making his debut two days later in a 6–0 friendly rout of FC Botev Krivodol where he scored twice.

On 30 June 2009, Marreco signed a two-year contract with Servette FC of the Swiss Challenge League. He then returned to his country, being loaned to C.D. Aves in a season-long move. In his debut as starter, on 28 October 2010, he scored a hat-trick in a 3–2 home win against Portimonense S.C. in the second round of the Taça da Liga.

Marreco continued competing mainly in the Segunda Liga the following years, with C.F. União, Associação Naval 1º de Maio and C.D. Tondela (two spells). In between, he also made a total of nine Primeira Liga appearances for S.C. Beira-Mar and S.C. Olhanense, failing to find the net.

In 2014–15, his second stint with Tondela, Marreco was crowned the competition joint-top scorer at 23 goals, helping the Viseu-based club reach the top flight for the first time in its history. On 31 August 2015, he signed with Belgian Pro League side Royal Mouscron-Péruwelz, but was loaned back to his country's second tier with G.D. Chaves in February.

In July 2016, Marreco returned to Académica after 11 years away, joining a club that had just been relegated from the top division. Having been loaned halfway through his first season to fellow league team F.C. Famalicão, he terminated his contract by mutual consent in June 2018.

In December 2018, Marreco dropped down a level and signed for Lusitânia FC.

Coaching career
After coaching in the youth ranks of Académica, Marreco was appointed at F.C. Oliveira do Hospital of the Campeonato de Portugal in June 2020. In his first season as a senior manager, he led the team to promotion to Liga 3; they avoided relegation in the following campaign.

On 15 June 2022, Marreco returned to Tondela as manager for the upcoming second-tier season. His debut for the newly relegated side was a 3–0 loss to FC Porto in the Supertaça Cândido de Oliveira on 30 July.

Honours
Tondela
Segunda Liga: 2014–15

Individual
Segunda Liga Player of the Year: 2014–15

References

External links

1987 births
Living people
People from Miranda do Corvo
Sportspeople from Coimbra District
Portuguese footballers
Association football forwards
Primeira Liga players
Liga Portugal 2 players
Segunda Divisão players
Associação Académica de Coimbra – O.A.F. players
FC Pampilhosa players
C.D. Aves players
C.F. União players
Associação Naval 1º de Maio players
S.C. Beira-Mar players
C.D. Tondela players
S.C. Olhanense players
G.D. Chaves players
F.C. Famalicão players
Lusitânia F.C. players
Eerste Divisie players
PEC Zwolle players
Deportivo Alavés players
First Professional Football League (Bulgaria) players
PFC Lokomotiv Mezdra players
Swiss Challenge League players
Servette FC players
Belgian Pro League players
Royal Excel Mouscron players
Portuguese expatriate footballers
Expatriate footballers in the Netherlands
Expatriate footballers in Spain
Expatriate footballers in Bulgaria
Expatriate footballers in Switzerland
Expatriate footballers in Belgium
Portuguese expatriate sportspeople in the Netherlands
Portuguese expatriate sportspeople in Spain
Portuguese expatriate sportspeople in Bulgaria
Portuguese expatriate sportspeople in Switzerland
Portuguese expatriate sportspeople in Belgium
Portuguese football managers
Liga Portugal 2 managers
C.D. Tondela managers